Mehmet Naki Yücekök also known as Nakiyüddin Yücekök, Nakiyüddin Bey (1866; Nasliç (Neapoli) - 2 February 1947; Istanbul) was a Turkish career officer, politician and secularist. He served as a military officer of the Ottoman Army and as a politician of the Republic of Turkey. He was a French teacher of Mustafa Kemal at the Salonica Military School.

Sources

1866 births
1947 deaths
Ottoman Military Academy alumni
Ottoman Army officers
Ottoman military personnel of the Balkan Wars
Turkish civil servants
Turkish people of the Turkish War of Independence
Republican People's Party (Turkey) politicians
Deputies of Muş
Burials at Edirnekapı Martyr's Cemetery
Deputies of Elazığ
Macedonian Turks
People from Kozani (regional unit)